The 1934 Grand Prix season saw the advent of the new 750 kg Formula. In an effort to curb the danger of rising speeds, the AIACR imposed this upper weight limit that effectively outlawed the large capacity engines. The incumbent manufacturers Alfa Romeo, Maserati and Bugatti had been preparing their new models with varying success – the best of which was the Alfa Romeo Tipo B. However, it was the state-sponsored arrival of the two German teams, Mercedes-Benz and Auto Union, and their innovative and progressive cars that ignited a new, exciting era of motor racing.

Scuderia Ferrari, running the Alfa Romeos, won the Monaco Grand Prix with their new signing, the young Franco-Algerian Guy Moll. Then, in a special, aerodynamic Alfa Romeo, he won the Avusrennen that saw the first appearance of Auto Union. His team-leader Louis Chiron had crashed out of the lead at Monaco, but took victory in the French Grand Prix. The German cars were fast but prone to new-car unreliability; however, Hans Stuck was able to claim Auto Union's first victory at their home Grand Prix. A controversial Customs decision kept the German teams out of the Belgian Grand Prix but they were back with a vengeance in the second half of the season. It started tragically with Faglioli's win at Pescara when Moll was killed closing in on the lead. Mercedes went on to win the Italian and Spanish races, while Auto Union won the inaugural Swiss Grand Prix at the new Bremgarten circuit.

This was one of the major watershed racing seasons, that saw one of the most abrupt shifts between the old and new regimes as the balance-of-power in European racing moved from Italy to Germany.

Grand Épreuves

A pink background indicates the race was run for Sports Cars or Touring Cars this year, while a grey background indicates the race was not held this year. Sources:

Major Races
Multiple classes are mentioned when they were divided and run to different race lengths.

Regulations
The 1934 season was a landmark year, which saw the introduction of the new 750 kg formula. The trend to now from the manufacturers had been to build bigger engines to get more power. So it was seen as the way to limit increasing speeds because the bigger engines and superchargers would weigh more. It effectively outlawed the Italian twin-engine models. However, it underestimated the advances made in metallurgy and using lightweight materials. The regulations stipulated a maximum weight of 750 kg, calculated excluding the driver, fluids and tyres. The minimum width, at the driver's seat, had to be 850mm. There was no restriction on the choice of fuel that could be used. In the USA the | AAA, facing the same issues, chose a fuel-consumption formula instead – 45 US gallons for the Indianapolis 500.

The AIACR also stipulated that their Grand Épreuves had to run for a minimum of 500 km. They also formally recognised the voiturette class, with a 1.5-litre maximum. However, the revived interest in Grand Prix racing by both manufacturers and spectators saw the smaller category slip back into the shadow. This would later change as it got more expensive to be competitive and privateers retreated back to the smaller class.

Technical Innovation
The three incumbent manufacturers in Gran Prix racing: Alfa Romeo, Maserati and Bugatti already had racing models close to the required weights, and those required only minor modification to conform to the regulations. Two additional manufacturers, from Germany, had shown intent to develop cars for the new formula. Mercedes-Benz had, of late, been more involved with sports-car racing with the powerful SSK while Auto Union was an unknown quantity. Both had been building and testing new grand prix cars in the previous year. The new German regime saw value in promoting motor-racing to the public and allocated RM450,000, split equally between the companies, to subsidise their development. Additional victory bonuses (20000, 10000, 5000) would be given for podium finishes. However, both companies estimated that the subsidies only covered about 10-20% of their total annual costs. Alfa Romeo, having been recently nationalised under the Istituto per la Ricostruzione Industriale (IRI), was also able to draw on national funding indirectly, albeit to a lesser extent. Unlike Hitler, Mussolini was an avid motor-racing fan and very knowledgeable.

The Tipo B was still the dominant car in racing and this year had a more powerful 2.9-litre engine fitted. In October 1933, Alfa Romeo had announced it would build 25 further cars for private sale, and orders quickly came in. But soon after, the company changed its mind leaving the drivers to soldier on with the increasingly obsolete 2.3-litre Monza.

Maserati had been the first manufacturer to unveil its model for the new formula. In 1934, the 3.0-litre 8CM monoposto was widened to meet the new regulations' minimum-width requirements. It was very fast but had proven very difficult to handle.
Bugatti had finally raced its new Type 59 at the very end of the 1933 season. The debut was quite anti-climactic with it found to be underpowered. In the close-season it was refitted with a 3.3-litre engine and better things were hoped for it.
However, further disappointing results against the new German cars stopped further development and Bugatti instead turned its attention to sports cars and the voiturette class. However, even there, the 1.5-litre Type 51A was now being outclassed by the Maseratis and British MGs.

However, the cars to beat were the two German cars, which both made sensational debuts. The radical Auto Union Type A (also known as the "P-Wagen") had been designed by Dr Ferdinand Porsche. Taking inspiration from the Benz Tropfenwagen of the mid-20s, the mid-mounted, supercharged V16 engine behind the driver put out an impressive 295 bhp. The driver sat almost over the front axle with the fuel tank right behind him. With the radiator at the front, coolant was channelled to the engine through the hollow frame tubing. Porsche's philosophy was to have a large-capacity motor with a moderate compression ratio to give great low-speed torque. The nature of the mid-engine design gave it fiendish understeer that challenged even the best drivers. In March, Hans Stuck set new world records with it for distance covered in one hour, 100 miles and 200 kilometres. Initially of 4360cc, later in the season it was bored out to 4950cc to put out 375 bhp.
Mercedes' entry was the W25, designed by Dr Hans Nibel. The supercharged 8-cylinder 3360cc engine had a twin-overhead camshafts, four valves per cylinder and put out 350 bhp exceeding the significant 100 bhp per litre mark. A press-release from Mercedes-Benz in March described the W25 as a “silvery arrow”.

Both designs were built using lightweight tubular frames (drilled out to save further weight) and had independent suspension on all four wheels. This was a first for grand prix cars, in complete contrast to the flexible chassis and rigid axle designs of the opposition that had not changed for a decade. The German advances gave far better traction and better cornering although drivers did find them quite a handful to control on bumpy street circuits. They also used special, exotic fuel mixtures developed by oil and chemical companies. It was not unusual for people near their pits to complain of headaches, nausea and respiratory problems. The fumes smelled of burnt almonds from the ricinus oil (castor oil) additive. Composed mainly of methanol, they barely gave 1mpg fuel economy.

Great Britain was making tentative steps back into grand prix racing. English Racing Automobiles (ERA) had only been formed in November the previous year. The first car was ready six months later, a 1.5-litre voiturette that raced at Brooklands. Two further chassis, with a 1.1-litre and a 2-litre engine, were also built. Company owner, and former racer, Raymond Mays used the latter to set a new record for the standing-start kilometre and prospects looked bright for the next season.

Teams and drivers

The previous season had seen its share of manoeuvring and upheaval, not helped by the sad loss of key drivers through the year in accidents. However, the advent of the new Championship saw the return of works racing teams. After a tumultuous year, the mercurial Nuvolari chose to remain an independent driver. The Scuderia Ferrari was still the designated team for Alfa Romeo and received close support from that manufacturer, with its uprated model. Louis Chiron, recruited near the end of the previous season was retained, and joined by former Bugatti teammate Achille Varzi and Algerian rising star Guy Moll. Team stalwarts Conte Carlo Felice Trossi (Ferrari president) and Gianfranco Comotti were called upon as needed as were other Italians as the Scuderia attempted to cover as many races in as many formats as possible.

Varzi had lost patience with Bugatti and its under-performing Type 59. In his stead, the team hired the young Jean-Pierre Wimille to join René Dreyfus, while Pierre Veyron competed in the voiturette races. They convinced Robert Benoist to come out of retirement, running his Bugatti garage in Paris, as well as offering Tazio Nuvolari a Type 59 (repainted red) for certain races. Their cable-operated brakes were now obsolete and a hindrance to getting peak performance.

Despite its temperamental nature, the Maserati 8CM was available to privateers and was picked up by a number of teams, including the Gruppo Genovese San Giorgio, Scuderia Siena and Whitney Straight. The Maserati works effort was wound back, with Goffredo Zehender running in selective events. The company instead put more focus on building racing cars for sale. The smaller 4C voiturette models (4CM and 4CS) were proving very competitive and popular. One of the most competitive customer teams was the Scuderia Subalpina, with Luigi Castelbarco, Giovanni Lurani and the up-and-coming Giuseppe Farina.

With the government backing, the two German teams entered racing with a patriotic line-up of all-German racers. The Auto Union team was managed by Willy Walb (who had driven the “Tropfenwagen” back in 1923). Their lead drivers would be Hans Stuck and Hermann, Prinz zu Leiningen, with August Momberger called out of retirement, and Wilhelm Sebastian as reserves.
The Mercedes team was led by Rudolf Caracciola, joined by young tearaway Manfred von Brauchitsch, along with Hanns Geier and world-record holding motorcycle racer Ernst Henne as reserves (although Henne was seriously injured in a testing accident in March.). However, team manager Alfred Neubauer had some misgivings about Caracciola, after convalescing from serious injury for a year and then suffering the sudden death of his wife in a skiing accident in February. He therefore decided to hire Italian Luigi Fagioli for his experience and expertise.

These tables only intend to cover entries in the major races, using the key above. It includes all starters in the Grandes Épreuves.
Sources:

Privateer Drivers

‘’Note: ‘’ * indicates only raced in the event as a relief driver,
“♠“ Works driver raced as a privateer in that race,
“v” indicates the driver ran in the Voiturette class,
“†” driver killed during this racing season,
Those in brackets show that, although entered, the driver did not race

Season review

Opening at Monaco
After several Scandinavian ice-races at the start of the year, the first major event was the glamorous Monaco Grand Prix, held on Easter Monday. The invitational field of 16 did not include the Germans, who wanted a race debut in Germany. Scuderia Ferrari arrived in force with five entries: Varzi and Trossi were given the new 2.9-litre Tipo B, while Chiron, Lehoux and his young protégé Guy Moll had the 2.6-litre versions. Bugatti had the 2.8-litre Type 59 for Dreyfus, Wimille and Robert Benoist (in his first race here since 1929). They also had a car painted red for Nuvolari – nominally an independent, but with strong works support, as did Pierre Veyron in a 2.3-litre Type 51. 
Officine Maserati only had the single works entry with an older 2.-5-litre Tipo 26M for Piero Taruffi. Wealthy Englishman, Earl Howe had a brand new 8CM, while Whitney Straight and Philippe Étancelin had their 1933 models. The final entries were Eugenio Siena in his older Maserati 26M and Renato Balestrero in an Alfa Romeo Monza.

The Maserati cars were all stretched to get under the 750 kg limit, draining oil from engines, gearboxes and axles and even resorting to alloy wheels to get below the line. On the first day of practice, Trossi was the only driver to get below a 2-minute lap, with a 1m59s, which he improved it to 1m58s on the Saturday. Étancelin, Varzi and Nuvolari were able to post 1m59s as well. Benoist had done a 2m02s but then had a major crash at the Ste Devote right-hander after the start. He was uninjured but the bent axle meant the car would be a non-starter. Howe had a split fuel tank but, as a former naval officer, was able to get repairs courtesy of the visiting British cruiser HMS Delhi, in port.
Race-day started with heavy rain, but by race start at 12.30pm it was sunny and dry again for the 100,000 spectators. Following the system started at Monaco the year before, the cars started according to their practice lap-times, with Trossi on pole, the cars lined up three-wide. But it was Chiron who darted through from the second row who took the initial lead. Trossi pitted after the first lap to change spark plugs. After 20 of the 100 laps, Chiron had a 5-second lead over Dreyfus, with Étancelin and Moll further back, and Nuvolari in fifth nearly a minute behind. Varzi had stopped for new plugs and was a lap back. Chiron continued to build his lead and by half-distance with only Étancelin, Dreyfus and Moll still on the lead lap. Then on lap 62 Étancelin slid wide and hit the sandbags, taking him out the race. Dreyfus was losing a lot of time with a failing clutch and was passed by Moll and Nuvolari. Although the Italian then had major brake problems of his own and had to pit, losing several laps.
All looked well for Chiron, who was easing off his lap-times to protect his car and holding a three-quarter lap lead over Moll. Then, with two laps to go, he lost concentration and hit the sandbags at the 180-degree Loews hairpin. By the time, he had extricated his Alfa; Moll was through and took a surprise victory over his team-mate. Dreyfus and Lehoux finished a lap behind.

Ferrari dominated the next event, just across the Alps at Alessandria. Run as two heats before a 15-lap final, the first heat was marred by a serious accident. It was run in heavy rain and on the first lap Swiss driver Carlo Pedrazzini crashed on a bridge. Thrown out, he later died of his injuries. The first heat was won by Chiron, the second by Varzi. The rain returned for the final and on the second lap Trossi baulked Nuvolari in his Maserati, at the same bridge as the earlier crash. Taking evasive action, the car ricocheted off two trees and rolled, ripping off the front suspension.  Nuvolari was taken to hospital with a broken leg. Thereafter, the race was a clean sweep for Ferrari taking the top four places: Varzi, Chiron, Tadini and Comotti.

Alfa Romeo Ascendant
The teams next moved across the Mediterranean to Libya for the Tripoli Grand Prix, held again in conjunction with a large state lottery worth 1.2 million lire prizemoney, split between the drivers and the successful ticket-holders. After the big windfall the previous year, the Mellaha circuit had received extensive improvements, with a huge grandstand constructed as well as a 40-metre high race officials' tower. The track had been widened and six sharp corners were given some banking. Scuderia Ferrari had six entries, including Chiron, Varzi, Moll and Trossi in 2.9-litre Tipo Bs. There were two Type 59 Bugattis for Dreyfus, Brivio and Wimille. The open-engine formula meant Maserati dusted off the big V5 bimotore for Taruffi (Nuvolari, though entered with them, was still in hospital), while Zehender had an 8CM. Amongst the privateers, Anglo-American Whitney Straight had two further 8CMs for himself and Hugh Hamilton and there were a squadron of 2.- and 2.6-litre Alfa Monzas, including Raymond Sommer, Swede Per-Viktor Widengren and Englishman George Eyston. Perhaps the most interesting entries were from the American Frank Scully who bought over two Miller-powered roadsters. Colonial governor Italo Balbo personally invited Peter DePaolo and Lou Moore after his notable aviation visit to the US for the Chicago World's Fair the year before. DePaolo had a 308cu in (5.2-litre) V8 4WD that put out 300 bhp and got up to 260 km/h. It was the first time a four-wheel drive car had competed in a Grand Prix. Moore had a 255cu in (4.2-litre) rear-drive in a Duesenberg chassis, which he had finished third in the Indianapolis 500 last year. Unfortunately their poor brakes would leave them at a significant disadvantage compared to a high-speed oval.
Practice had several spectacular accidents, for Zehender, Dreyfus and Varzi, fortunately without serious injury. A huge crowd was on hand to see the 26 cars, lined up 5-wide in numerical order, take the start. From the front row, Taruffi took the lead in the big Maserati, followed by Chiron, Varzi, Hamilton, Trossi and Wimille. Zehender's Maserati only lasted one lap, still with many issues from his practice accident. Chiron took the lead on lap 4 and started building a gap. Then on lap 7, Taruffi's front axle locked sending him into a vicious set of spins before riding up a sand dune and getting airborne. Thrown out, the driver was just missed as the machine landed beside him. Doused in petrol and with a broken arm, Taruffi was quickly taken to hospital. The race settled down and as the drivers stopped for fuel and tyres after an hour, Varzi overtook Chiron in the pits, and Moll had moved up to third ahead of Hamilton, who retired on lap 30 with a broken magneto. Going into the last quarter of the race, the three Alfas were a lap ahead of the field. Moll put in some lightning-quick laps to reel in his team-mates dicing for the lead. Chiron narrowly led with two laps to go, but going into the final lap, Varzi had a 100-metre advantage over Moll with Chiron suffering oil pressure problems. Going into the last corner, Moll made a lunge but Varzi squeezed him to get a better run down the long straight to the finish, crossing side-by-side with Varzi just half a car-length ahead of an angry Moll.

The 25th Targa Florio should have been a significant event but was now a dismal affair, with just a small all-Italian entry. A single Bugatti and Maserati took on eleven Alfas on the abbreviated, piccolo circuit. In a wet race, Varzi took a comfortable victory for a Ferrari 1–2, but it was marred by the severe accident of Giovanni Alloatti when his Bugatti slid off the bridge at Cardellino and fell ten metres. Taken to hospital with a broken back, he died three weeks later.
Held on the same day, the top French drivers were at Casablanca. Scuderia Ferrari had split their options and sent Chiron and Lehoux and Comotti to Morocco. They were challenged by the privateer Maseratis of Sommer, Étancelin and Straight. Once again Chiron had a comfortable lead, but this time his car was reliable and he could take the win a lap ahead of Étancelin and Lehoux.

Enter Auto Union
The Avusrennen had a great expectation around it, as it heralded the race debut of the new German teams. Three cars from each squad arrived, all in a polished silver – due to the bare aluminium buffed to a high sheen, saving 2–3 kg weight without the number of coats of lacquer paint normally applied (at odds with Neubauer's fanciful anecdote that white paint was scraped off to save weight). The respective drivers were Caracciola, Faglioli and von Brauchitsch for Mercedes and Stuck, zu Leiningen and Momberger for Auto Union. 
Ferrari arrived with three Tipo Bs, two regular 2.9-litre cars for Varzi and Chiron and a special streamlined version for Moll, fitted with a bigger 3.2-litre engine. German Paul Pietsch raced a 2.6-litre Monza. Maserati had an 8CM for Zehender who replaced the Taruffi, injured at Tripoli. He was supported by Earl Howe in his own car and the indefatigable Nuvolari, still recovering from the double fracture of his leg, racing another Maserati with his leg in plaster. Pete DePaolo brought the big Miller 4WD to Berlin, while Moore had returned to the US for the Indy 500. Bugatti had entered four cars but pulled out just days before the race.
A huge crowd of 220,000 came to the Berlin circuit. However, there was drama when Mercedes withdrew following practice – citing fuel pump problems affecting their top speed. As the eleven remaining cars formed up on the grid, an intense hailstorm hit the track. Although Chiron led off from the line, Stuck had a 47-second lead over the three Alfas by the end of the first lap. After six laps, the rain had stopped and the track was drying. Moll moved into second when Chiron who pitted, over a minute behind Stuck. He then took the lead as Stuck also pitted with a slipping clutch, which eventually led to his retirement. Moll carried on steadily and completed the fifteen laps with a comfortable 90-second gap to Varzi, ahead of Momberger (who had set the fastest lap but also had clutch problems late in the race). Although extremely fast, the new cars did not have the reliability yet.
Earlier in the afternoon, the 1.5-litre voiturette race was held. Pierre Veyron, in the works Bugatti, had resumed his rivalry with Ernst-Günther von Burggaller, also in a Bugatti Type 51A, from the year before. This time Veyron had the victory in another close contest.

A week later, the teams met again for the Eifelrennen at the Nürburgring. The track had just completed a number of improvements. The race was held on the same day as the Montreux race in Switzerland. Both the Auto Union and Mercedes-Benz teams were present although Caracciola did not practice, as he felt his leg would not withstand the strain of that circuit. Ferrari split its team between the two races, with Chiron and Tadini coming here, supported by five other cars including Paul Pietsch, Per-Viktor Widengren and Mlle Hellé Nice. Nuvolari arrived with his Maserati, and his leg still in plaster. Once again, the Bugatti works team did not attend but there were a number of privateer cars. There was the story that the Mercedes cars were found to be 1 kg overweight at scrutineering, so team manager Neubauer had the paint stripped off the cars. Down to a thin coast of aluminium paint on the polished metal, the press coined them the "Silver Arrows".
The grid was augmented by a 1.5-litre class and an 800cc class, to combine to be the largest field yet run at the Nürburgring, with 44 cars. Another huge crowd of 200,000 people turned up and after morning fog and cloud had cleared, the race started in sunshine.
Starting from the front row, von Brauchitsch took the lead, soon joined by teammate Fagioli who had weaved through the field from the eighth row of the grid. However, only 300 metres from the start, the Bugatti of Austrian Emil Frankl went off at the Südkurve. The car rolled and got airborne, landing in the middle of the road and throwing the driver out. The unconscious Frankl was taken to Adenau hospital but died later. The race settled down with the two Mercedes ahead of Stuck and Chiron. Fagioli was directed to follow team orders and stay behind to allow a German driver take the team's first victory. This left him furious, and at his next pit-stop he had blazing row about it with Neubauer. Von Brauchitsch took the victory, with Mercedes winning on debut, with Stuck coming second. Fagioli did not finish, as he stopped on the straight leading up to the grandstand and walked off – supposedly due to a broken fuel line.

The new Montreux race was a street-race through the Swiss town at the eastern end of Lake Geneva with narrow, tight corners and over tram tracks. The Ferrari team sent half their team, with Varzi, Moll and Trossi. Officine Maserati had Goffredo Zehender running a 2.5-litre Tipo 26M, while Whitney Straight had his two 8CMs, as did Étancelin. The other privateer team was the Ecurie Braillard, who hedged their bets entering a Bugatti (Braillard), a Maserati (Falchetto) and an Alfa Romeo (Sommer) while Veyron ran his factory-supported Bugatti T51. After heavy rain in the morning, the cars lined up in order of practice times, and Étancelin took the lead from his pole position. On a difficult track to pass, he pulled away from the chasing pack, led by Straight, Varzi and Trossi. When Straight had to slow to wipe oil off his goggles, the Ferrari drivers picked up the pursuit. For 88 of the 90 laps, Étancelin led but then his brakes started to fade and Trossi caught and passed him to take the win.

French Grand Prix

The premier race of the year saw the German teams racing outside of Germany for the first time this season, each with their regular three drivers used previously. Bugatti had deliberately stayed away from other races to prepare their Type 59s for the race. Their drivers would be Benoist (making his racing comeback) and Dreyfus, joined by a recovering Nuvolari. The three Ferrari drivers chosen were Varzi, Chiron and Trossi, while Maserati had Zehender in an uprated 3-litre Tipo 26M. Étancelin was the only privateer, but had works support from Maserati this time. Raymond Sommer was going to run the new SEFAC design, but when the car proved far from race-ready, the entry was withdrawn. American Pete DePaolo was supposed to run a Maserati for the Ecurie Braillard, but had been injured a fortnight earlier at the Spanish Penya Rhin race and was not present.
Forty laps of the Montlhéry circuit was a fraction over the minimum 500 km stipulated by the AIACR for Grand Épreuves. The organisers had installed a new electric timing system that printed out the car number and its lap time to a tenth of second each lap. In practice the Auto Unions soon put in the fastest laps, with Stuck equalling the lap record on his first flying lap, despite having never raced at Montlhéry before. Most teams had problems – Bugatti and Maserati with ignition, Auto Union with fuel pumps and Mercedes with tyre wear. Although the Bugattis were five seconds faster than Nuvolari's lap record, they were will still seven seconds slower than the best Mercedes time. The race started in very hot weather; zu Leiningen was unwell and did not race. From the third row, Chiron jumped the start and overtook Caracciola at the end of the first lap to take the lead. Stuck overtook him on lap 4 and together they built a lead over the Mercedes of Fagioli and Caracciola. The Bugattis of Benoist and Nuvolari had both pitted early on with spark plug troubles. Neubauer gave his drivers the hurry-up and Fagioli broke the lap record several times as he closed back up.

After an hour (12 laps), after Stuck had pitted for fuel and tyres there were two distinct Alfa-Mercedes duels: with Chiron battling Fagioli and Varzi hounding Caracciola a minute back. Then suddenly it was all change: a few laps later Fagioli went wide and broke a hydraulic brakepipe and Caracciola stopped out on the track with fuel-feed problems. Stuck was hampered with an overheating engine and now third, a lap down. Trossi pitted the third Alfa and Moll relieved him, in a car without first gear. At halfway, after 20 laps, there were only six cars remaining, with Alfa Romeo running 1-2-3, ahead of Stuck, Benoist and Zehender several laps down. The race petered out to a boring procession, with Stuck and Zehender both retiring later and Benoist finishing four laps behind. It was a dominant display by Alfa Romeo who had matched the German cars for speed and outlasted them in reliability. A week later, the Scuderia Ferrari repeated the 1-2-3 finish at the Marne Grand Prix (albeit without any German cars present), this time with Moll finishing second ahead of Varzi.

German Grand Prix
A fortnight after the French GP, many of the same protagonists arrived for the German GP at the Nürburgring. However, the German teams had their problems. Prinz zu Leiningen was in hospital with kidney disease, so after trials, Ernst Burggaller was called up to drive the third Auto Union, alongside Stuck and Momberger. Then in practice, Mercedes driver von Brauchitsch crashed, getting concussion and two broken ribs. His place was taken by reserve driver Hans Geier. Scuderia Ferrari had their regular three (Chiron, Varzi and Moll) with additional Alfa Romeo Monzas entered by two other Italian teams, the Scuderia Siena and Gruppo Genovese San Giorgio. Zehender once again had the older works Maserati 26M, while Nuvolari and Hugh Hamilton (driving for Whitney Straight) had the more modern 8CM models. Bugatti was a notable absentee. An estimated 200,000 spectators arrived for the 25-lap race. 
From the start, the German cars dominated with Stuck and Caracciola building a lead. After seven laps both Varzi and Moll had retired with broken gearboxes, leaving Chiron vainly in pursuit of the leaders (having himself lost third gear). Caracciola took the lead at the halfway point when Stuck had to take avoiding action trying to lap Geier spinning right in front of him at the Karussell corner.  However, he burned out a piston and was forced to retire a lap later. With three laps to go, Stuck came past the pits in the lead, gesticulating at an overheating engine. The team waved him on, and he had enough time in hand to nurse the car home for Auto Union's first victory. Fagioli was second for Mercedes while Chiron finished eight minutes back and Nuvolari was a lap behind in fourth.

The week after was the Coppa Ciano, run on the long, winding Montenero Circuit. Latterly a major international event but this year it was an all-Italian affair with Alfa Romeos being 14 of the 19 starters (including five from Scuderia Ferrari). The opposition was led by Nuvolari and his Maserati 8CM while Giuseppe Tuffanelli raced the works car, a 3-litre 8C model. In the race, it was Moll and Nuvolari who duelled for the lead initially but when Moll had to pit for a new wheel hub and Nuvolari had suspension problems, it was Varzi who came through for the victory ahead of them.
Once again, Ferrari split their team to run at the Dieppe GP on the same weekend. Run as two heats and a two-hour final, the event was tainted by the death of Jean Gaupillat, a regular Bugatti privateer for eight years. The Frenchman's only major victory had been in this event in 1929. In a surprise result, Philippe Étancelin and his Maserati beat the Ferrari pair of Chiron and Lehoux.

The Belgian Grand Prix had an abbreviated entry list – the German teams did not arrive when the Belgian Customs office demanded 180,000 francs in duty for their alcohol-based racing fuel. This was a sizeable sum, considering the race-winner would only receive 50,000 francs. Nuvolari had been unluckily delayed driving from Italy by European politics – Austria was in the middle of the July Putsch. This just left a rather pitiful seven entries – the two Ferrari Alfas for Chiron and Varzi would be against a full Bugatti team of Benoist, Dreyfus and Brivio. The other two cars were Raymond Sommer's privateer Maserati, and 55-year old veteran Charles Montier bringing his old Ford V8 Special.
From the start on a drizzly day, the Bugattis had sparkplug issues. Already by quarter-distance, the two Alfas had lapped the field and were cruising to victory when Chiron made an uncharacteristic mistake. Just after his pitstop, he went off at the Eau Rouge chicane and rolled the car. He was lucky to end over a drain that stopped him being crushed. Then, only nine laps later, Varzi brought his Alfa into the pits smoking from a blown engine. Suddenly Dreyfus found himself with an improbable lead, that he held to the finish ahead of Brivio. Sommer had been running ahead but a long pit-stop left him in third and he finished a lap back.

Races in Italy and Switzerland
Yet again, the Coppa Acerbo promised to be the most exciting race of the year, with the German cars coming to Italy for the first time. The triangular Pescara Circuit was long and very fast. From the city, it wound up into the Apennine foothills, before an 11 km long straight downhill to Montesilvano and a sprint along the coast back to the startline. This year, the circuit was modified with an artificial chicane coming into Pescara to slow the cars in front of the grandstands. Mercedes brought Henne in for the injured von Brauchitsch, joining Caracciola and Faglioli. Auto Union were without Leiningen (ill) and Momberger (injured) so Stuck was joined by Wilhelm Sebastian. He had been Caracciola's mechanic when they won the 1931 Mille Miglia and latterly Auto Union's lead mechanic. Ferrari entered four cars, for Chiron, Varzi, Moll and Ghersi. A single works Bugatti arrived, with Brivio driving a 3.3-litre Type 59. Maserati supported Zehender's entry and there were also 8CM models for Nuvolari, Whitney Straight and Earl Howe. Straight also had an older Maserati 26M for Hugh Hamilton (who won the voiturette preliminary race in an MG K3). Completing the field were the privateer entries of Secondo Corsi (Maserati 8C-2800) and Englishman Clifton Penn-Hughes (Alfa Romeo Monza). Four days earlier, Italy's first 24-hour sports car race, the Targa Abruzzo, was held on the track, and dominated by the Alfa Romeo 8C. It also gave Moll and Ghersi, who competed, extensive track knowledge. 
Practice was run in hot weather, and on a timed flying kilometre on the downhill straight, Caracciola and Henne were getting up to 290 km/h (180 mph) in their Mercedes. This was 20 km/h faster than the Alfa Romeos, while the privateer Maseratis were barely reaching 230 km/h. There was an incident when Fagioli went off in the twisty hilltop section at Spoltore, flying over a ditch and landing in a field, fortunately without serious repercussions. Race-day morning had sporadic showers pushed by the very strong south-easterly Scirocco wind. Although it stopped just as the cars lined up, the track was still very wet and slippery and the teams swapped their smooth racing tyres for grooved road ones. From the front row, Stuck, Varzi and Caracciola set the pace and the latter soon showed off his skill in the rain, taking the lead by the end of the first of twenty laps. Varzi and Stuck chased hard to stay in touch, but it broke Varzi's gearbox and Stuck's pistons, and they retired early. Caracciola had soon built a sizeable lead, but then on lap 9 made an rare error. Intermittent showers and strong winds made conditions random and difficult. In a similar place to Faglioli's practice accident, he slid off the track but landed in the ditch, wrecking the car. Faglioli took the lead, but when he stopped to refuel on the same lap, Moll roared past with Henne in hot pursuit. Varzi had taken over Ghersi's Alfa, going very fast and back up to fourth, ahead of Brivio and Nuvolari.
Moll pitted on lap 11, giving a resurgent Varzi the lead ahead of Faglioli. However, the hard driving had taken a toll on Varzi's tyres and he then pitted again. And so it continued, with all three putting in very fast laps – Moll set a new lap record of 10m 51s to close the gap to Faglioli down to 15 seconds. He overcooked it coming into the chicane on lap 17 and spun. The same lap a despondent Varzi pitted with oil problems and handed the car back to Ghersi to try and make it to the finish. The next lap, Moll came up behind Henne to lap him through the mountain section. Leaving the Capelle hairpin onto the downhill straight, he tried to squeeze past immediately. His wheels slipped into the roadside ditch - whether it was a sudden wind gust or the narrowness of the road is unknown (the cars did not touch). Moll fought the car for fifty metres before a wheel hit a roadside post and catapulted the car into the air. Somersaulting for 300 metres, Moll was flung out and killed instantly when he hit a concrete wall. Faglioli won ahead of Nuvolari, Brivio and Ghersi.

The next major event was the inaugural Swiss Grand Prix, held at the 7.3 km Bremgarten circuit in the forest park north of Bern. Opened in 1931, it was the first purpose-built circuit in Switzerland and had only hosted motorcycle races to date. However, in the past year a new grandstand and pit complex had been built. A unique feature among tracks at this time was that the pits were on a separate road to the main track. Although it had no long straights, the track's sweeping curves made it a fast, exciting track for the drivers. A quality field of 20 was entered – led by the trio of cars from Auto Union and Mercedes-Benz. Dreyfus had the sole works Bugatti Type 59, while Hungarian privateer László Hartmann had a 2.3-litre Type 51, Ferrari had Varzi, Chiron and Ghersi, while the San Giorgio team had both a Monza (Balestrero) and a Maserati 8C (Biondetti). There were also three other 8CM Maseratis for Nuvolari, Earl Howe and Hugh Hamilton (driving for Whitney Straight).
Stuck had done the fastest lap in practice to start from pole position, while the grid position of the other drivers was decided by lot. Earlier in the day, a voiturette race was held attracting the best field of the year. Starting from the back row, in pouring rain, Englishman Richard Seaman in Whitney Straight's 1.1-litre MG, came through the field to beat the 1.5-litre cars. The main race started in light rain at 1pm, and Stuck immediately shot off into the lead. The rain got heavier then eased off by lap 3, by which time had Stuck already built a 30-second lead over Nuvolari, Chiron and Dreyfus. On lap 9, Caracciola stopped at the points. His leg was aching badly, so the Mercedes relief driver Hanns Geier replaced him. After half an hour, and ten laps, Stuck had a lead of a minute, setting new fastest-laps each circuit. As the track dried, the cars came past the finish line at 230 km/h taking the first bend flat out.
Around half-distance, as the fuel-stops came round, Stuck was able to come in and get out maintaining his lead. Dreyfus got his Bugatti out in second place ahead of Chiron. Nuvolari had already retired with a broken engine, with flames coming from the exhausts. After 50 laps, Stuck had a 2-minute lead over Dreyfus who was the only other driver on the lead lap. Momberger had caught and passed Chiron, and moved up to second when Dreyfus had to pit with five laps to go. Stuck took the chequered flag, having led start to finish, a lap ahead of his teammate Momberger. The event ended with tragedy though, when Hugh Hamilton crashed his Maserati braking for the Forsthaus corner. A puncture threw him off the track, bouncing off one pine-tree before slamming into another, killing the unfortunate Hamilton instantly and seriously injuring two spectators.

The 1933 edition of the Italian Grand Prix had been a tragic affair, known as the "Black Day of Monza". This year, the full circuit was abandoned and instead a 4.3 km track was contrived running in the opposite direction. Doubling back along the main straight, it took in the banked Curva Sud where a chicane had now been installed then, using the "Florio Link" halfway along the back straight, connected with the road course – a tight, taxing Monza course of hairpins and right-hand corners. The German teams both arrived with four cars, including ones for testing. Defending Italian honour, Ferrari also had four cars – for Varzi, Chiron, Comotti and Comte Trossi (stepping in for the deceased Moll). Maserati had Zehender running a works , and offered Nuvolari their brand new  with its 3.7-litre straight-six engine. The car was still getting prepared during race practice. There were also privateer Maseratis for Whitney Straight and Swiss Hans Rüesch. Bugatti entered a Type 59 for Brivio, in Dreyfus' absence, while Earl Howe had his older Type 51. On the first day of practice, in an unusual incident, the Auto Union team offered Caracciola (Mercedes) and Chiron (Alfa Romeo) an opportunity to drive their car. They both found the car powerful, but below-par in handling and brakes. Another feature of the Auto Union was that the glycol engine coolant ran through the hollow car frame instead of dedicated piping to save weight. However, in the hot Italian sun its higher temperature made the cockpit exceedingly uncomfortable for the driver.
The 116-lap race attracted 100,000 spectators. Brivio was a non-starter as he had blown his supercharger in practice. From the third row, Fagioli muscled his Mercedes to the front by the end of the first lap. Henne misjudged his braking at the front hairpin and punted Trossi off the track, damaging his own radiator and steering as well. Faglioli did the same on the next lap, dropping four places and was another early retirement for Mercedes, with a broken gearbox. This left the four remaining German cars at the front. Varzi and Nuvolari were thrilling the crowd duelling for fifth. This lasted twenty laps until the Maserati had to pit for new tyres. Momberger pitted with the soles of his feet burnt and blistered by his hot metal pedals, and was relieved by spare-driver Sebastian. In the half-distance pit-stops, the Mercedes did not need to change tyres, unlike the others, but Caracciola had badly bruised his right arm in the car and Faglioli jumped in to roar out into the lead. Leiningen had missed his pit signals, and ran out of fuel on the back straight. When he got back to the team, he was able to relieve Stuck who was exhausted and also had burnt feet. By lap 80, Fagioli had a one-lap lead over the Alfas of Varzi and Trossi and the Stuck/Leiningen Auto Union while Nuvolari was running fifth, three laps down with almost no brakes. Comotti, in sixth, was refuelling when overflowing gas hit the exhaust and burst into flames. An alert fire marshal immediately doused the fire and Comotti, although unconscious was pulled out uninjured, able to recover and then later relieve Trossi. Varzi retired on lap 97 with a broken gearbox, and in the torrid conditions, Fagioli was able to nurse home the Mercedes to take the win, over Stuck/Leiningen and Trossi/Comotti.

End of the season
Due to the devolving political situation, the staging of the Spanish Grand Prix had been uncertain, but a late confirmation saw the race go ahead with a good entry list for 30 laps of the long 17 km Lasarte circuit. Ferrari arrived, as did both German teams, and there was a full entry from Bugatti who had Dreyfus and Brivio joined by Nuvolari and Wimille. In practice, the Bugattis were several seconds faster than the competition and despite being overweight at scrutineering, managed to trim down to pass review. In the race, Stuck took the initial lead only to stop on track with a broken oil-pipe. This left Wimille battling the Mercedes of Fagioli and Caracciola for the lead as, for once, the Bugattis had a good set-up with good speed. Wimille lost six minutes with a carburettor problem allowing the German team to take a 1–2 victory. Nuvolari finished just a minute behind in what was one of Bugatti's best races of the year, well ahead of Scuderia Ferrari.
At the Masaryk Circuit, the three big teams again squared off, although the arthritis afflicting August Momberger meant Wilhelm Sebastian again filled the third Auto Union seat. Maserati brought their new  car for Nuvolari again, while Benoist and Wimille their Bugatti Type 59s as private-entries. The field was filled out with a number of local drivers in older models. Sadly, one of those drivers, Josef Brázdil was killed in practice on his first lap, going off at high speed into the trees alongside the track. In front of a huge crowd, the race was duel between the Auto Union of Stuck and the Mercedes of Fagioli trading the lead back and forth. As the track broke up, the race was decided when Fagioli had to pit to change sparkplugs with three laps to go. Stuck won by three minutes from the Italian, with Nuvolari a further minute back in third. The accompanying voiturette race saw the future world champion Giuseppe Farina in the sole Maserati hold off the Bugattis of Ernst Burggaller and Bruno Sojka, and MGs of George Eyston and Richard Seaman for a flag-to-flag victory.

Although the German teams had had a haphazard opening season, the signs of the imminent sea-change in motorsport were clear. Hans Stuck won three major races for Auto Union that countered the initial dominance of the Alfa Romeos of Scuderia Ferrari. Stuck won the German Championship, while Varzi claimed the Italian Championship. Bugatti had not been competitive this season and the win by René Dreyfus in Belgium would prove to be the last major grand prix victory for the dominant marque of the '20s. The French and Italian teams had soon realised their cars were inferior, but instead squandered time and resources on multiple designs rather than settling on one for the formula and developing that, as the German teams did. Hans Nibel, Mercedes Technical Director died of a heart attack in November, to be replaced by engineer and former driver Max Sailer.

Race Results

Drivers' Race Results

Bold font indicates starting on pole position, while italics show the driver of the race's fastest lap.
Only those drivers with a best finish of 6th or better, or a fastest lap, are shown. Sources:

Manufacturers' Race Results

Citations

References
 Acerbi, Leonardo (2015) Mille Miglia – A race in pictures    Milan: Giorgio Nada Editorie  
 Cimarosti, Adriano (1997) The Complete History of Grand Prix Motor Racing    London: Aurum Press Ltd  
 Fondi, Pino (2006) Targa Florio: 20th Century Epic    Milan: Giorgio Nada Editore  
 Fox, Charles (1973)    The Great Racing Cars & Drivers    London: Octopus Books Ltd  
 Georgano, Nick (1971) The Encyclopaedia of Motor Sport    London: Ebury Press Ltd  
 Higham, Peter (1995) The Guinness Guide to International Motor Racing    London: Guinness Publishing  
 Legate, Trevor (2006) 100 years of Grand Prix    Kent: Touchstone Books Ltd  
 Ludvigsen, Karl (2008) Racing Colours - Italian Racing Red    Surrey: Ian Allan Publishing Ltd  
 Ludvigsen, Karl (2009) Racing Colours - German Racing Silver    Surrey: Ian Allan Publishing Ltd  
 Monkhouse, George (1953) Grand Prix Racing Facts and Figures   London: G.T. Foulis & Co Ltd
 Montagna, Paolo (ed.) (1989) The Legendary Italian Grand Prix   Milan: A.C. Promotion
 Rendall, Ivan (1993) The Chequered Flag – 100 years of Motor Racing    London: Weidenfeld & Nicolson Ltd  
 Reuss, Eberhard (2008) Hitler's Motor Racing Battles    Yeovil: Haynes Publishing  
 Spurring, Quentin (2017) Le Mans 1930-39    Sherbourne, Dorset: Evro Publishing  
 Venables, David (2008)    Racing Colours - British Racing Green    Surrey: Ian Allan Publishing Ltd  
 Venables, David (2009) Racing Colours - French Racing Blue    Surrey: Ian Allan Publishing Ltd

External links

  1934 Race Season – comprehensive race reports of most events, also listing entries and results. Retrieved 20 Jun 2021
  Grand Prix Winners 1895–1949 : History – Hans Etzrodt's description of the annual regulations, and changes. Retrieved 20 Jun 2021
 TeamDan  - Darren Galpin's list of the major races, entrants and results of the season. Retrieved 20 Jun 2021
 SpeedFreaks  - list of the major races, entrants and results of the season. Retrieved 20 Jun 2021
  6th Gear  - list of the major races and winners each year. Retrieved 20 Jun 2021
  MotorSport magazine – list of the year's races, entrants and results, by category. Retrieved 20Jun 2021
  Grand Prix History – history of the Targa Florio race. Retrieved 20 Jun 2021
 La Targa Florio – race report and pictures of the Targa Florio. Retrieved 20 Jun 2021
  F2 Register – race results of the Targa Florio. Retrieved 20 Jun 2021
  Motorsport Memorial – motor-racing deaths by year. Retrieved 20 Jun 2021
  ChampCar Stats – list of all the races, entrants and results of the AAA Championship. Retrieved 20 Jun 2021
  Classic Car Catalogue – range of period pictures of the cars racing. Retrieved 8 Apr 2021
  YouTube – Monaco Grand Prix with sound (1 minute). Retrieved 3 Apr 2022

Grand Prix seasons
1934 in motorsport